Anekal  is a major town and taluk of Bengaluru Urban district. It is a major town in the suburbs of Bengaluru city. Approximately 36 km from Bengaluru Centre and around 15 km from  Hosur and Electronic City. Express lines run from Silk Board to Anekal passing through the National Highway and SH broadway thus providing excellent connectivity. It lies in the southern part of the Bangalore metropolitan area. Anekal is known for the Karaga and Dasara festivals.

Major MNCs and IT-BT companies like Infosys, Biocon, Wipro, HCL, TCS, Accenture and so on are all part of Anekal Taluk.

The population has more nearly doubled since 2011.

History
Anekal, town situated about 35 km from Bangalore, is a municipal town. The town was founded in about 1603 by Chikka Thimme Kuruba Gowda of the Sugatur family, the General of Bijapur, after annexing Thimme Kuruba Gowda's hereditary possessions of Hoskote, granted him Anekal.  He thereupon erected the fort and temple and constructed a large tank.  At the time of his grandson Dodda Thimme Kuruba Gowda, Anekal was annexed by Mysore.  The Chief continued, by paying tribute to Mysore.  Finally Haidar Ali expelled the rulers, and Anekal became part of Mysore.

Geography 
It has an average elevation of 915 metres (3001 feet).

Demographics
 India census, Anekal had a population of 44,260. Males constitute 52 percent of the population and females 48 percent. Kannada and Telugu are most spoken languages in Anekal. Anekal has an average literacy rate of 67 percent, higher than the national average of 59.5 percent, with 56 percent of the males and 44 percent of females literate. 12 percent of the population is under 6 years of age. Anekal in Kannada translates to 'Elephant rock'.

Education 
 Guruji Vidyaniketan
 Vidhatha Global High School, Anekal
 Prarthan Computech "Computer Training Center" Anekal
 ASB Government High School, Anekal
 Dr.S. Gopalaraju Govt First Grade College, Anekal
 Royal English High School, Indalvadi Cross, Anekal Taluk
 Sri Sairam College of Engineering
 Shirdi Sai Pre-University College
 Ravikiran computer Anekal
T.M.C Computer Education(R), Anekal
 Omsai Enterprises, Anekal (Cyber Center & Stationery shop)
 Shirdi Sai Nautical Science Academy
 Urdu Higher Primary School Anekal
 Regional Theology Extension Center, Jnanajyothi
 Swamy vivekananda (pre-university college)
 Alliance University
 Lincoln Memorial English School (English-language medium school)
 St. Joseph High School
 St. Joseph's Pre-University College (Anekal) Attibele Road 

 Sri Saraswathi Vidyaniketana, Dommasandra
 Sri Saraswathi Vidyaniketana Independent PU College, Dommasandra
 Anekal Public School, Anekal
 Pearl Valley English School, Anekal
 Saraswathi Vidya Mandira, Anekal 
 New Baldwin International Residential School, Anekal
 M. Tress Primary and High School, marsur gate anekal-chandapura mainroad, Anekal.
 Padmashree Computers (Aadhaar and Ratio Card)
 Kaushlya Training Center (Skill Development Center)
 Bharathi High School (This is the first girls' high school established in Anekal)
 DMM High School
 Government Pre University College Dommasandra college code AS545 near Muthanalluru Cross Janatha Colony Ground Bangalore 562125
 Sir M V Computer Literacy, Dommasandra
 Shine Systems Laptop and Desktop Sales And Service (Chandapura)
 National Public School
 Sri Aravinda High School, Anekal

Economy 
Anekal is one of the growing towns around Bangalore urban district, situated close to major economic sites like Electronic City, Jigani and Hosur. Muthyala Maduvu also known as Pearl Valley is a major tourist spot just a few km from the town and attracts tourists from all over the state. Anekal is also known for its Silk industry and is home to a number of skilled weavers.

Religion 

 Sri Someshwara temple located at hinnakki village which has a shivalinga of 12th century and anekal taluk first granite roof 
 Sri Thimmarayaswamy temple located at Anekal is well known for fair and Karaga Utsava.
 Kambada Ganesha temple located in the town center, is well known for its monolithic statue of Lord Ganesha on a long pillar.
 Sri Amrutha Mallikarjuneshwara and Sri Bhramarambika temple are one of the many historical temples located in the town.
 Sri Avimukteshwara Deva (ಶ್ರೀ ಅವಿಮುಕ್ತೇಶ್ವರ ದೇವ) at Neriga village (ನೆರಿಗೆ)
 Shri Bhooneela Sameta Channakeshavaswamy Devasthana, Haragadde, Karnataka 560105 - Temple of Lord Chennakeshava in Anekal believed to have been established by Arjuna 
 Sri Madduramma Temple in Huskur
Sri Channaraya Swami Temple Huskuru Village Anekal Talk 
 God Vishnu  in Brundaavana are the ten primary avatars of Vishnu, a principal Hindu god which established in 12th century (1222)

 Sri Bandi Mahakaliamma Temple in Marsur Madiwala
 Lord Srirama Temple (Sri BhooNeela Sametha Cheluva Champaka Varadaraja Swamy) in Narayanaghatta Village

References

External links
Website

Cities and towns in Bangalore Urban district